Jtest is an automated Java software testing and static analysis product developed by Parasoft.  The product includes technology for Data-flow analysis, Unit test-case generation and execution, static analysis, and more. Jtest is used by companies such as Cisco Systems and TransCore. It is also used by Lockheed Martin for the F-35 Joint Strike Fighter program (JSF).

Awards
Jtest won the 19th Dr.Dobb's Jolt Product Excellence & Productivity Awards in the security tool category (as part of Parasoft's Application Security Solution).  Previously, Jtest was granted a Codie award from the Software and Information Industry Association (SIIA) for "Best Software Testing Solution" in 2007 and 2005. It also won "Technology of the Year" award as "Best Application Test Tool" from InfoWorld two years in a row in 2006 and 2007. Jtest first received the Jolt Award for Excellence in 2000.

See also

Automated testing
List of unit testing frameworks
List of tools for static code analysis
Regression testing
Software testing
System testing
Test case
Test-driven development
xUnit, a family of unit testing frameworks

References

External links
Jtest page

Abstract interpretation
Computer security software
Extreme programming
Java platform
Java development tools
Security testing tools
Software review
Software testing tools
Static program analysis tools
Unit testing
Unit testing frameworks